Miguel Ángel Julio Rossete (born 21 February 1991) is a Colombian footballer who plays as a central midfielder for Delfines del Este.

Club career
Julio began his footballing career in Colombia with Independiente Medellín of Categoría Primera A, he made his first-team debut on 20 February 2009 in a league encounter against Real Cartagena. Two more appearances came during the 2009 Apertura season before Julio appeared nine times more in the 2012 Apertura season. In 2012, Julio signed for Venezuelan Primera División team Trujillanos. A year later he completed a move back to Colombia to join América de Cali, fourteen appearances subsequently followed in the 2013 campaign. On 19 January 2015, Julio joined Primera B Nacional side Atlético Tucumán.

Julio participated in twenty-four matches for the club in 2015, as they won promotion into the 2016 Argentine Primera División. In December 2016, he was released by Tucumán. In 2019, Julio headed to the Dominican Republic to play for Moca in Liga Dominicana. He scored twice in the 2019 campaign. In 2020, after a spell with Serie B's Club Real Deportivo, Julio joined Delfines del Este.

International career
Julio represented Colombia at U15, U17 and U20 level. He scored two goals in twelve caps for the Under-17s, while he won eight caps for the Under-20s during two South American Youth Football Championship competitions in 2009 and 2011 respectively.

Personal life
In June 2017, it was reported that Julio had attempted suicide. He was found face down in his apartment, though once hospitalised his condition wasn't critical; he had reportedly been suffering with depression and drug abuse.

Career statistics
.

Honours
Atlético Tucumán
Primera B Nacional: 2015

References

External links
 

1991 births
Living people
People from Santa Marta
Colombian footballers
Colombia youth international footballers
Colombia under-20 international footballers
Association football midfielders
Colombian expatriate footballers
Expatriate footballers in Venezuela
Expatriate footballers in Argentina
Expatriate footballers in the Dominican Republic
Colombian expatriate sportspeople in Venezuela
Colombian expatriate sportspeople in Argentina
Colombian expatriate sportspeople in the Dominican Republic
Categoría Primera A players
Categoría Primera B players
Venezuelan Primera División players
Primera Nacional players
Argentine Primera División players
Liga Dominicana de Fútbol players
Independiente Medellín footballers
Trujillanos FC players
América de Cali footballers
Atlético Tucumán footballers
Moca FC players
Delfines del Este FC players
Sportspeople from Magdalena Department